Draza or Draža may refer to:

 Draža (given name)
 Daraza, town in the Khairpur District of Sindh province, Pakistan

See also 
 Dražan